It's Great to Be Young is a 1956 musical Technicolor comedy film about a school music teacher, starring Cecil Parker and John Mills.

Plot
Mr Dingle (John Mills) seeks to interest his pupils in music in order to enjoy life, while the new strict headmaster, Mr Frome (Cecil Parker),believes Dingle is ruining the children's traditional education.

Mr Dingle's pupils come up with a way to raise money by playing to crowds in the street and persuade him to help them. When this fails they decide to jazz it up and bring in some younger kids to help. This initiative is a success and, with the help of one of the pupil's parents, they are able to buy new musical instruments. The total cost, £200, is to be paid in instalments of £2.10s.  per week which Dingle personally signs for.

However, when Mr Dingle ends up on the front page of the local newspaper, the headmaster locks the instruments up. The pupils manage to get them out of the locked cupboards, rehearse and put them back without anyone noticing.

Mr Dingle takes a second job playing the piano in his local pub for £4 a week plus free beer. However,  he is spotted by one of the teachers who reports him to Mr Frome, who sacks him for it. The children protest about Dingle's dismissal by organising a strike and a sit-in. Children from other schools also stand outside in protest.

Eventually, order is restored as Mr Frome relents and allows Mr Dingle to return. The children carry both out triumphantly to the tune of Top of the Form.

Cast
 John Mills as Mr. Dingle
 Cecil Parker as Frome
 John Salew as Routledge
 Elizabeth Kentish as Mrs. Castle
 Mona Washbourne as Miss Morrow
 Mary Merrall as Miss Wyvern
 Derek Blomfield as Paterson
 Jeremy Spenser as Nicky
 Dorothy Bromiley as Paulette
 Brian Smith as Ginger
 Wilfred Downing as Browning
 Robert Dickens as Morris
 Dawson France as Crowther
 Carole Shelley as Peggy
 Richard O'Sullivan as Lawson
 Norman Pierce as Publican
 Eleanor Summerfield as Barmaid
 Bryan Forbes as Mr. Parkes, Organ Salesman
 Marjorie Rhodes as Landlady
 Eddie Byrne as Morris
 Russell Waters as Mr. Scott, School Inspector

Soundtrack
The song "You are My First Love" is sung over the opening scenes of the film by Ruby Murray. Released on record, it reached number 16 in the UK charts.

Reception
The film was one of the ten most popular films at the British box office in 1956.

BFI Screenonline writes, "It's Great To Be Young! has a fair claim to be not only one of Britain's first teenage musicals but also one of the most commercially successful of any musical made in Britain during the 1950s – it proved so popular that it allegedly caused riots in Singapore. Its virtues are those of many ABPC productions of its era, from the vibrant Eastmancolor cinematography to the immaculately-selected cast and even if some of the sixth-formers are aged in their twenties, they do sound convincing as teenagers."

References

External links
Synopsis from Movies at AOL
 
It's Great to Be Young! at BFI Screenonline

1956 films
Films shot at Associated British Studios
1956 musical comedy films
British high school films
British musical comedy films
Films directed by Cyril Frankel
Films with screenplays by Ted Willis, Baron Willis
1950s English-language films
1950s British films